Experience Media Studios is a movie and television studio headquartered in Abu Dhabi, United Arab Emirates. It is the first movie and television studio organized in the emerging UAE media industry.

Background
The company is a media studio, with multiple projects across current and emerging media distribution outlets and platforms.

Current developments
Under current development are The Global Citizen Awards, a live, globally broadcast event that recognizes and awards major contributions to the advancement of mankind, Zayed, a biographical movie about his highness Sheikh Zayed bin Sultan Al Nahyan, the late ruler of Abu Dhabi and founding father of the United Arab Emirates. and Abdulla Omar and the Lost Sand City, a fictional adventure movie featuring the first Emirati action hero.

In early 2010, the company expanded its operations in the North American marketplace, opening offices in Las Vegas, Nevada, and appointing Jason Kay as Vice President of Production for North America. The studio immediately acquired Carmel (film) and completed it by February 2011. Following a title change, The Forger (film) was released on DVD on July 3, 2012.

In February 2013, Experience Media Studios optioned 'Possessed Soul' from Jason Whittier, planning to adapt it for a new entertainment media technology the studio has been developing.

References

External links
  Experience Media Studios website
  Hollywood Expat Behind-The-Scenes blog

Entertainment companies of the United Arab Emirates
Mass media in Abu Dhabi
Film production companies of the United Arab Emirates
Television production companies of the United Arab Emirates
Companies based in Abu Dhabi
Entertainment companies established in 2009
2009 establishments in the United Arab Emirates
New media